The MONIAC (Monetary National Income Analogue Computer), also known as the Phillips Hydraulic Computer and the Financephalograph, was created in 1949 by the New Zealand economist Bill Phillips to model the national economic processes of the United Kingdom, while Phillips was a student at the London School of Economics (LSE). The MONIAC was an analogue computer which used fluidic logic to model the workings of an economy. The MONIAC name may have been suggested by an association of money and ENIAC, an early electronic digital computer.

Description

The MONIAC is approximately 2 m high, 1.2 m wide and almost 1 m deep, and consisted of a series of transparent plastic tanks and pipes which were fastened to a wooden board. Each tank represented some aspect of the UK national economy and the flow of money around the economy was illustrated by coloured water. At the top of the board was a large tank called the treasury. Water (representing money) flowed from the treasury to other tanks representing the various ways in which a country could spend its money. For example, there were tanks for health and education. To increase spending on health care a tap could be opened to drain water from the treasury to the tank which represented health spending. Water then ran further down the model to other tanks, representing other interactions in the economy. Water could be pumped back to the treasury from some of the tanks to represent taxation. Changes in tax rates were modeled by increasing or decreasing pumping speeds.

Savings reduce the funds available to consumers and investment income increases those funds. The MONIAC showed it by draining water (savings) from the expenditure stream and by injecting water (investment income) into that stream. When the savings flow exceeds the investment flow, the level of water in the savings and investment tank (the surplus-balances tank) would rise to reflect the accumulated balance. When the investment flow exceeds the savings flow for any length of time, the surplus-balances tank would run dry. Import and export were represented by water draining from the model and by additional water being poured into the model.

The actual flow of the water was automatically controlled through a series of floats, counterweights, electrodes, and cords. When the level of water reached a certain level in a tank, pumps and drains would be activated. To their surprise, Phillips and his associate Walter Newlyn found that MONIAC could be calibrated to an accuracy of 2%.

The flow of water between the tanks was determined by economic principles and the settings for various parameters. Different economic parameters, such as tax rates and investment rates, could be entered by setting the valves which controlled the flow of water about the computer.  Users could experiment with different settings and note the effect on the model. The MONIAC's ability to model the subtle interaction of a number of variables made it a powerful tool for its time.
When a set of parameters resulted in a viable economy the model would stabilise and the results could be read from scales. The output from the computer could also be sent to a rudimentary plotter.

MONIAC had been designed to be used as a teaching aid but was discovered also to be an effective economic simulator. At the time that MONIAC was created, electronic digital computers that could run complex economic simulations were unavailable. In 1949, the few computers in existence were restricted to government and military use. Neither did they have adequate visual display facilities, so were unable to illustrate the operation of complex models. Observing the MONIAC in operation made it much easier for students to understand the interrelated processes of a national economy. The range of organisations that acquired a MONIAC showed that it was used in both capacities.

Phillips scrounged a variety of materials to create his prototype computer, including bits and pieces from war surplus such as parts from old Lancaster bombers. The first MONIAC was created in his landlady's garage in Croydon at a cost of £400.

Phillips first demonstrated the MONIAC to a number of leading economists at the LSE in 1949. It was very well received and Phillips was soon offered a teaching position at the LSE.

Current locations

It is thought that twelve to fourteen machines were built. 
 The prototype was given to the Economics Department at the University of Leeds, where it is currently on exhibition in the reception of the university's Business School. Copies went to three other British universities.
 Other computers went to the Harvard Business School and Roosevelt College in the United States and Melbourne University in Australia. The Ford Motor Company and the Central Bank of Guatemala are believed to have bought MONIACs.
 A MONIAC owned by Istanbul University is located in the Faculty Of Economics and can be inspected by interested parties.
 A MONIAC from the LSE was given to the Science Museum in London and, after conservation, was placed on public display in the museum's mathematics galleries.
 A MONIAC owned by the LSE was donated to the New Zealand Institute of Economic Research in Wellington, New Zealand. This machine formed part of the New Zealand Exhibition at the Venice Biennale in 2003. The MONIAC was set to model the New Zealand economy. In 2007 this machine was restored and placed on permanent display in the Reserve Bank of New Zealand Museum.
 A working MONIAC (or Phillips Machine as it is known in the UK) can be found at the Faculty of Economics at Cambridge University in the United Kingdom.  This machine was restored by Allan McRobie of the Cambridge University Engineering Department, who holds an annual demonstration to students.
 A replica of the MONIAC at the central bank of Guatemala was created for a 2005-6 exhibition entitled "Tropical Economies" at the Wattis Institute of the California College of the Arts in San Francisco.
 The MONIAC at The University of Melbourne, Australia, is on permanent display in the lobby of the Giblin Eunson Library (Ground Floor, Business and Economics Building, 111 Barry st, Carlton, Melbourne).  The faculty has extended an invitation to anyone interested in restoring the MONIAC to functional capacity.
 Erasmus University Rotterdam (EUR) has owned a MONIAC since 1953. It was a gift from the City of Rotterdam for EUR's 40th anniversary. It is located in the THEIL building.
 Clausthal University of Technology in the faculty of economic sciences.
 Vrije Universiteit Amsterdam had a MONIAC built in 1951 by their own instrument makers department, modeled after the original. It was called the ECOCIRC (Economic Flow Circulator Demonstrator). Nowadays it is located on the 8th floor of the Main Building.

Popular culture
The Terry Pratchett novel Making Money contains a similar device as a major plot point. However, after the device is fully perfected, it magically becomes directly coupled to the economy it was intended to simulate, with the result that the machine cannot then be adjusted without causing a change in the actual economy (in parodic resemblance to Goodhart's law).

See also
 Analog computer
 Hydraulic macroeconomics
 Phillips curve
 Water integrator

References

.

Documentary
 "The League of Gentlemen". Third Episode of Pandora's Box, a documentary produced by Adam Curtis

External links

 BBC Radio Four programme 'Water on the brain'.
 NZIER's Moniac Machine Article includes picture of NZIER Moniac
 Inc. article: When Money Flowed Like Water
 Wetware article: Money Flows: Bill Phillips' Financephalograph
 enginuity article
 
 
 A great disappearing act: the electronic analogue computer Chris Bissell, The Open University, Milton Keynes, UK. Presented at IEEE Conference on the History of Electronics, Bletchley Park, UK, 28–30 June 2004. Moniac on pages 6 and 7. Accessed February 2007
 Catalogue of the AWH Phillips papers at the Archives Division of the London School of Economics.
 
 Video of the Phillips Machine in operation  Allan McRobie demonstrates the Phillips Machine at Cambridge University and performs calculations. (A lecture given in 2010).
  Contains detailed diagrams of the Machine workings
 The Phillips Machine Article includes links to videos of the machine in operation.
 
 LSE Photo of Phillips with the machine
 Bill Phillips Lecture by Alan Bollard, 16 July 2008
Philips Machine Simulator
Phillips Economic Model on display in the Science Museum, London
 Istanbul University Moniac Meeting

1940s computers
Analog computers
Computer-related introductions in 1949
Early British computers
Economics models
Mechanical computers
New Zealand design